Param Digvijay Dal is a registered political party of India. It was registered in 2014 from Election Commission of India.

Agenda

The platform of Param Digvijay Dal includes;
Establishment of such a society in which life, respect & property of people be safe.
Establishment of a casteless society.
The slaughter of innocent animals & birds must be prohibited.
The government income of every financial year must be equally distributed to every citizen.
End of double taxation.
Complete governance of law.
The constitutional fundamental duties must be legally enforced on every citizen.
Allocation of jobs according to ability.
Illegal occupancy must be suppressed.
Criminals never be excused from punishment and must be declared guiltless after punishment.
There must be one education system for every Indian citizen and double education system must be terminated.
Traditional and cottage industries must be respected.
Permanent construction must be prohibited on agricultural land.
Respect of national games.
One time licence.
End of retirement system.
End of minimum and maximum age limit for jobs.
Establishment of a taxless nation.

References 

Political parties in Uttar Pradesh
Political parties established in 2014
2014 establishments in Uttar Pradesh